Brodney Depaul Pool (born May 24, 1984) is a former American football safety in the National Football League (NFL) for the Cleveland Browns and New York Jets. He played college football at Oklahoma.

Early years
Pool attended Westbury High School, where he was a five star recruit. As a junior, he had 114 tackles and 4 interceptions. During his senior season, he tallied 75 tackles and 11 interceptions (school record) at free safety. As a running back, he had 40 carries for 159 yards (3.975-yard avg.), 2 rushing touchdowns, 3 receptions for 112 yards (37.3-yard avg.) and 2 receiving touchdowns. 

He also lettered in track.

College career
Pool accepted a football scholarship from the University of Oklahoma. In 2002, as a true freshman he appeared in 12 games, playing mainly on special teams and making 11 tackles (7 solo). 

As a sophomore, he became a starter at free safety, registering  68 tackles (41 solo), 2 sacks, 6 passes defensed, one forced fumble, one blocked kick and 7 interceptions (fourth in school history).

As a junior, he was on the Thorpe and Nagurski Watchlists, posted 92 tackles (led the team), 65 solo tackles, 9 passes defensed (led the team) and 2 interceptions. He declared for the NFL Draft at the end of the season.

He finished his college career with 171 tackles, 9 interceptions, 15 passes defensed, 2 sacks, 2 forced fumbles and one fumble recovery. He was a part of two Big 12 championship teams (2002 and 2004).

Professional career

Cleveland Browns
Pool was selected by the Cleveland Browns in the second round (34th overall) of the 2005 NFL Draft. Although he did not start during his rookie season, he appeared in 13 games mostly as a safety, registering his first interception. He registered 25 tackles, one sack, one interceptions, 7 passes defensed, 10 special teams tackles and 2 fumble recoveries.

In 2006, he lost out the battle for the starting free safety position to Sean Jones, but started 3 games at cornerback due to injuries to Leigh Bodden, Daylon McCutcheon and Gary Baxter. He posted 54 tackles, one interception, 10 passes defensed, one sack, 20 special teams tackles and 2 fumble recoveries.

In 2007, he became the regular starter at free safety, making 72 tackles, 6 passes defensed and 2 interceptions, one of which was returned for a Browns' franchise record 100 yards against the Baltimore Ravens on November 18.

In 2008, he started 15 games after missing the season opener. He recorded 65 tackles, 3 interceptions, 4 passes defensed, one sack, one forced fumble and one fumble recovery.

In 2009, he missed the last 5 games of the regular season after suffering a concussion and being placed on the injured reserve list, but still tied for the team lead with 4 interceptions. He also had 48 tackles, 10 passes defensed, one sack and 2 special teams tackles. He wasn't given a contract offer as a restricted free agent at the end of the year because of his concussion history.

New York Jets
On March 11, 2010, Pool signed a one-year deal as an unrestricted free agent with the New York Jets valued at $1.3 million. He finished the regular season with 63 tackles, one interception, 9 passes defensed, 2 special teams tackles, one forced fumble and one fumble recovery. 
He made his first career postseason start and his first career postseason appearance against Indianapolis Colts on Wild Card weekend, making 7 tackles (one for loss), as the Jets won 17-16. On January 23, he recorded his first career postseason interception in the AFC Championship Game against the Pittsburgh Steelers. However, the Jets lost 24-19, falling one game short of the Super Bowl for the second straight season. 

On August 3, 2011, he signed a one-year deal with the Jets. He appeared in 14 games (6 starts), posting 37 tackles, a half sack, one interception, 3 passes defensed and 6 special teams tackles. He missed 2 games with a knee injury.

Dallas Cowboys
On March 15, 2012, Pool signed as a free agent with the Dallas Cowboys, reuniting with former Browns defensive coordinator Rob Ryan. He failed his conditioning test upon arriving at camp, before passing it on his second attempt. On August 6, he was released one week into the start of training camp.

NFL statistics

Key
 GP: games played
 COMB: combined tackles
 TOTAL: total tackles
 AST: assisted tackles
 SACK: sacks
 FF: forced fumbles
 FR: fumble recoveries
 FR YDS: fumble return yards 
 INT: interceptions
 IR YDS: interception return yards
 AVG IR: average interception return
 LNG: longest interception return
 TD: interceptions returned for touchdown
 PD: passes defensed

Coaching career
On January 16, 2015, Pool accepted a quality control coaching position at Baylor University on the staff of Art Briles.

Personal life
His mother Rose, was the Westbury High School athletic director and an assistant track coach at the University of Texas.

References

External links
 Oklahoma bio

1984 births
Living people
Players of American football from Houston
American football safeties
Oklahoma Sooners football players
Cleveland Browns players
New York Jets players